The Concerto for Trumpet and Orchestra is a composition for trumpet solo and orchestra by the British composer Peter Maxwell Davies.  The work was commissioned by the Philharmonia Orchestra for its then principal trumpeter John Wallace.  It was given its world premiere by Wallace and the Philharmonia Orchestra under the conductor Giuseppe Sinopoli in Hiroshima on 21 September 1988.

Composition
The Trumpet Concerto has a duration of roughly 28 minutes and is composed in three connected movements:
Adagio – Allegro
Adagio molto
Presto

Parts of the music are derived from the medieval plainsong Franciscus pauper et humilis, commonly associated with the Roman Catholic friar Francis of Assisi about whom Davies had intended to compose an unrealized opera.

Instrumentation
The work is scored for a solo trumpet and a large orchestra comprising two flutes, alto flute, two oboes, cor anglais, two clarinets, bass clarinet, two bassoons, contrabassoon, four horns, three trumpets, three trombones, tuba, timpani, four percussionists, and strings.

Reception
The Trumpet Concerto has been praised by music critics.  Arnold Whittall of Gramophone wrote:
The work was similarly praised by Bernard Holland of The New York Times, who observed:

See also
List of compositions by Peter Maxwell Davies

References

Compositions by Peter Maxwell Davies
1988 compositions
Davies, Peter Maxwell
Music commissioned by the Philharmonia Orchestra